Meiss Ej Jabal     is a village in the  Marjeyoun District in Lebanon.

Name
According to E. H. Palmer, the name Meis comes from  the name of a tree.

Location
The municipality of Meiss Ej Jabal is located in the Kaza of Marjaayoun one of is one of the eight mohafazats (governorates) of Lebanon. Meiss Ej Jabal is 114 kilometers (70.8396 mi) away from Beyrouth (Beirut) the capital of Lebanon. Its elevation is 630 meters (2067.03 ft - 688.968 yd) above sea level. Meiss Ej Jabal surface stretches for 1924 hectares (19.24 km² - 7.42664 mi²).

History
In 1596, it was named as a village,  Mis, in the Ottoman nahiya (subdistrict) of  Tibnin  under the liwa' (district) of Safad, with a population of  75  households and 11 bachelors, all Muslim. The villagers paid a  fixed tax-rate of 25% on  agricultural products, such as wheat, barley, summer crops, olive trees, vegetable and fruit garden or orchard, goats, beehives; in addition to occasional revenues, a press for olive oil or grape syrup and a winter pastures; a total of 12,860  akçe.

In 1881, the PEF's Survey of Western Palestine (SWP) found here:  "ancient remains; one olive-press and two sarcophagi on the east side." They further described it: "A large village in two parts, containing about 700 Metawileh, on low ridge, surrounded by figs, olives, and arable land. There is a birket near the village, and three good springs to the north, besides cisterns."

Shrine
The village  holds a Shia shrine for the prophet's companion Abu Dharr. Another Shia shrine to Abu Dharr is located in Sarepta.

Educational Establishments

References

Bibliography

External links 
 http://yameis.org/
Meiss Ej Jabal, Localiban
Survey of Western Palestine, Map 2:   IAA, Wikimedia commons

Populated places in Marjeyoun District
Shia Muslim communities in Lebanon